The Yamaha TA 125 was a production racing motorcycle produced by the Yamaha Motor Company from 1973 to 1975. The motorcycle was powered by a two stroke 125 cc engine, and was Yamaha's first production racer.

References

TA125
Grand Prix motorcycles